The Permian Hermit Formation, also known as the Hermit Shale, is a nonresistant unit that is composed of slope-forming reddish brown siltstone, mudstone, and very fine-grained sandstone. Within the Grand Canyon region, the upper part of the Hermit Formation contains red and white, massive, calcareous sandstone and siltstone beds that exhibit low-angle cross-bedding. Beds of dark red crumbly siltstone fill shallow paleochannels that are quite common in this formation. The siltstone beds often contain poorly preserved plant fossils. In the Sedona, Arizona area, it averages  in thickness. The upper contact of the Hermit Formation is typically sharp and lacks
gradation of any kind.

See also
 Geology of the Grand Canyon area

References

Popular Publications
 Blakey, Ron and Wayne Ranney, Ancient Landscapes of the Colorado Plateau, Grand Canyon Association (publisher), 2008, 176 pages, 
 Chronic, Halka. Roadside Geology of Arizona, Mountain Press Publishing Co., 1983, 23rd printing, pp. 229–232, 
 Lucchitta, Ivo, Hiking Arizona's Geology, 2001, Mountaineers's Books,

External links 
 Mathis, A., and C. Bowman (2007) The Grand Age of Rocks: The Numeric Ages for Rocks Exposed within Grand Canyon, Grand Canyon National Park, Arizona, National Park Service, Grand Canyon National Park, Arizona.
 Shur, C., and D. Shur (2008) The Hermit Formation In Northern Arizona. Arizona Fossil Adventures.

Sandstone formations of the United States
Natural history of the Grand Canyon
Geologic formations of Arizona
Geologic formations of Nevada
Geologic formations of Utah
Permian Arizona
Permian geology of Nevada
Permian geology of Utah
Cisuralian Series of North America